Fyodor Fyodorovich Buchholz (Russian: Фёдор Фёдорович Бухгольц), born Teodor Buchholz (9 June 1857,  Włocławek - 7 May 1942, Saint Petersburg) was a Polish-born Russian painter, graphic artist and art teacher of German ancestry. He specialized in genre and historical scenes. Some of his works became popular postcards.

Biography 
Teodor Alexander Ferdinand Buchholz was born in Włocławek, to Eleonora née Fothke and Teodor Gustaw Buccholz, who owned a printing press. After graduating from the realschule in his hometown, he enrolled at the Imperial Academy of Fine Arts in St. Petersburg, where, between 1878 and 1886, he studied under the guidance of Pavel Chistyakov and Valery Jacobi. Later, for a long time, Teodor himself lectured at the Imperial Academy of Arts in St. Petersburg. 
From 1880 to 1882, he was awarded three silver medals. In 1885, he was presented with a gold medal and the title of "Artist" for his rendering of Daedalus and Icarus. After 1888, he participated in the Academy's exhibitions as well as those of the "".

While he was still a student, he began working as a graphic artist: providing illustrations for Niva,  (North, a literary magazine) and Homeland (a scientific/historical journal). In 1891, he joined the "Association of Russian Illustrators". From 1893 to 1919, he was a teacher at the Imperial Society for the Encouragement of the Arts. In 1902, he won the competition to design the Saint Petersburg Bicentenary medal. He mainly created battle, landscape and generic paintings, in the Art Nouveau style. He put most of his paintings up for display in St. Petersburg, while also having a display at the Zachęta National Gallery of Art in Warsaw.

After the Revolution, he was involved in the creation of agitprop and helped design the celebrations for revolutionary holidays. In 1918, he developed sketches for the anniversary celebrations in Petrograd (Saint Petersburg), which included a triumphal arch on Vasilyevsky Island. In 1924, he became a member of the Association of Artists of Revolutionary Russia and, from 1932, was with the Union of Russian Artists. Between 1919 and 1932, he taught at various secondary schools and Houses of Culture. His wife was Russia's first female sculptor, Maria Dillon. He died during the Siege of Leningrad and was buried at the Smolensky Lutheran Cemetery.

Selected works

References

External links

1857 births
1942 deaths
19th-century Polish painters
19th-century male artists from the Russian Empire
20th-century Polish painters
20th-century Russian male artists
19th-century painters from the Russian Empire
20th-century Russian painters
Russian male painters
Russian people of German descent
Russian genre painters
Soviet artists
People from Włocławek
Polish male painters
Victims of the Siege of Leningrad